Wenche Krossøy (25 October 1943 – 12 March 2010) was a Norwegian children's writer.

She issued the books Mens pappa er på Lofoten (1974), Magdalena (1977), Den sovande fuglen (1983) and Blåhuset (1985) and then the picture books Gullnøkkelen (1987), Den kvite steinen (1989), Angelus (1993) and Evighetslyset (1997).

References

1943 births
2010 deaths
Norwegian children's writers
Norwegian women children's writers
20th-century Norwegian women writers